Xanthagaricus flavosquamosus is a species of the fungal family Agaricaceae.This species is described from China.

References

Fungi of China
Agaricaceae